Igor Alekseyevich Udaly (born 8 December 1984) is a Russian former professional football player.

Club career
He made his Russian Premier League debut for FC Anzhi Makhachkala on 28 July 2018 in a game against FC Ural Yekaterinburg, after playing the first 13 seasons of his career in the lower-tier leagues, mostly Russian Football National League.

Career statistics

Notes

External links
 

1984 births
Living people
Russian footballers
Association football defenders
FC Chernomorets Novorossiysk players
FC Luch Vladivostok players
FC Sodovik Sterlitamak players
FC SKA-Khabarovsk players
FC Orenburg players
Russian Premier League players
FC Anzhi Makhachkala players
FC Kuban Krasnodar players
FC Rotor Volgograd players
FC Dynamo Makhachkala players